Salvia chienii is a perennial plant that is native to Anhui and Jiangxi provinces in China, growing on hillsides and streamsides at around  elevation.

There are two named varieties. S.  chienii var. wuyuania has no hairs on the stems, leaves, and petioles, a slightly larger corolla, and grows on streamsides in Jiangxi province.

References

chienii
Flora of China